The two-finned round herring (Spratellomorpha bianalis) is a species of fish in the family Clupeidae. It is endemic to Madagascar. Its natural habitat is rivers.  It is the only species in its genus.

References

two-finned round herring
Freshwater fish of Madagascar
two-finned round herring
two-finned round herring
Taxonomy articles created by Polbot